April 14 - Eastern Orthodox liturgical calendar - April 16

All fixed commemorations below are observed on April 28 by Eastern Orthodox Churches on the Old Calendar.

For April 15th, Orthodox Churches on the Old Calendar commemorate the Saints listed on April 2.

Saints

 Apostles Aristarchus of Apamea, Pudens, and Trophimus of the Seventy Apostles (c. 67)  (see also: April 14 - Greek)
 Martyrs Basilissa and Anastasia of Rome, disciples of Apostles Peter and Paul (c. 68)
 Martyr Sukia (Suchias) and nineteen companions with him, including (c. 100-130):
 Andrew, Anastasius, Thalaleus, Theodoretus, Ivchirion, Jordan, Quadratus, Lucian, Mimnenus, Nerangius, Polyeuctus, Jacob, Phocas, Domentianus, Victor, and Zosima (Chorimos), of Georgia, in Armenia.
 Hieromartyr Theodore and martyr Pausilippus of Thrace, by the sword (c. 117-138)
 Martyrs Maximus and Olympiada, in Persia (c. 249-251)
 Saint Leonidas, Bishop of Athens (250)
 Martyr Crescens of Myra in Lycia, by fire (3rd century)  (see also: April 13 - Slavic)
 Martyr Sabbas the Goth, at Buzău in Wallachia (372)  (see also: April 12 - Greek and Romanian)
 Saint Ephraim the Great of Atsquri (9th century)  (see also: April 17)

Pre-Schism Western saints

 Martyrs Maro, Eutyches and Victorinus, at Rome, under Trajan (c. 99)
 Martyr Eutychius, in Ferentino in Italy.
 Child-martyr Laurentinus Sossius, a boy aged five, martyred on Good Friday in Valrovina near Vicenza in Italy (485)
 Saint Paternus (Paternus of Vannes, Padarn), Bishop and founder of the monastery of Llanbadarn Fawr (the great monastery of Padarn) near Aberystwyth in Wales (565)  (see also: April 16)
 Saint Ruadhan (Ruadan, Rodan), one of the leading disciples of St Finian of Clonard, founder and abbot of Lothra, Ireland (c. 584)
 Saint Silvester, second Abbot of Moutier-Saint-Jean (Réome) near Dijon in France (c. 625)
 Saint Hunna, the self-sacrificing wife of a nobleman in Alsace, now in France (679)
 Saint Nidger (Nidgar, Nitgar), Abbot of Ottobeuren Abbey in Bavaria, became Bishop of Augsburg in Germany (c. 829)
 Saint Mundus (Munde, Mund, Mond), an abbot who founded several monasteries in Argyll in Scotland (c. 962)

Post-Schism Orthodox saints

 Saint Mstislav-Theodore, Prince of Kiev (1132)
 Venerable Basil of Moldovita, Igumen of Moldovița Monastery and Wonderworker (ca. 1455)
 Venerable Dionysius of Pereyaslavl-Zalessky, monk of the Nikitsky Monastery (1645)
 Hieromartyr Ananias (Lambardis) of Lacedaemonia, Metropolitan Bishop of Lacedaemonia (1764)
 Basil of Poiana Mărului (1767)
 Righteous Daniel of Achinsk, Siberia (1843)

New martyrs and confessors

 New Hieromartyr Alexander Gnevushev, Priest (1930)

Other commemorations

 Repose of Hieroschemamonk Michael (Pitkevich) of Valaam and Pskov Caves, the last Elder of Valaam (1962)
 Repose of Bishop Stephen (Nikitin) of Kaluga (1963)

Icon gallery

Notes

References

Sources
 April 15 / April 28. Orthodox Calendar (pravoslavie.ru).
 April 28 / April 15. Holy Trinity Russian Orthodox Church (A parish of the Patriarchate of Moscow).
 April 15. OCA - The Lives of the Saints.
 The Autonomous Orthodox Metropolia of Western Europe and the Americas. St. Hilarion Calendar of Saints for the year of our Lord 2004. St. Hilarion Press (Austin, TX). p. 29.
 April 15. Latin Saints of the Orthodox Patriarchate of Rome.
 The Roman Martyrology. Transl. by the Archbishop of Baltimore. Last Edition, According to the Copy Printed at Rome in 1914. Revised Edition, with the Imprimatur of His Eminence Cardinal Gibbons. Baltimore: John Murphy Company, 1916. p. 106.
 Rev. Richard Stanton. A Menology of England and Wales, or, Brief Memorials of the Ancient British and English Saints Arranged According to the Calendar, Together with the Martyrs of the 16th and 17th Centuries. London: Burns & Oates, 1892. p. 159.
Greek Sources
 Great Synaxaristes:  15 Απριλίου. Μεγασ Συναξαριστησ.
  Συναξαριστής. 15 Απριλίου. ecclesia.gr. (H Εκκλησια Τησ Ελλαδοσ). 
Russian Sources
  28 апреля (15 апреля). Православная Энциклопедия под редакцией Патриарха Московского и всея Руси Кирилла (электронная версия). (Orthodox Encyclopedia - Pravenc.ru).
  15 апреля (ст.ст.) 28 апреля 2013 (нов. ст.). Русская Православная Церковь Отдел внешних церковных связей.

April in the Eastern Orthodox calendar